Stade Municipal is a multi-use stadium in Notsé, Togo.  It is currently used mostly for football matches and is the home stadium of Anges FC.  The stadium holds 1,000 people.

External links
Stade Municipal de Notsé, soccerway.com

Municipal